Maccabi Pardes Katz,, is an Israeli football club based in Pardes Katz neighborhood of Bnei Brak.

History
The club was founded in 2012 as an initiative by local person, Roni Itzhak, to revive senior football in Pardes Katz following the closure of Beitar Pardes Katz in 2007. The club joined Liga Gimel Tel Aviv division, where they played ever since.

Seasons

External links
Beitar Pardes Katz The Israel Football Association

References

Pardes Katz
Pardes Katz
Association football clubs established in 2012
2012 establishments in Israel
Pardes Katz Maccabi